The molecular formula C47H80O19P3 may refer to:

 Phosphatidylinositol 3,4-bisphosphate
 Phosphatidylinositol 3,5-bisphosphate
 Phosphatidylinositol 4,5-bisphosphate

Molecular formulas